Staudtia stipitata is a species  of plant in the family Myristicaceae. Commonly known as Bokapi, M'bonda (Cameroon), Niove, M'boun (Gabon), Kamashi or Nkafi (Zaire) it produces red brown to yellow brown wood with a fine grain.

References

Myristicaceae